Matías Domínguez (born 9 September 1992) is a Chilean amateur golfer. In 2015, he won the first Latin America Amateur Championship at Pilar, Argentina, earning an invitation to the 2015 Masters Tournament. He played college golf at Texas Tech University.

Amateur wins
2011 Match Play Chile Championship, Golf Chilean Federation Championship
2014 Cachagua Open
2015 Latin America Amateur Championship

Results in major championships

CUT = missed the half-way cut

Team appearances
Eisenhower Trophy (representing Chile): 2010, 2014

References

Chilean male golfers
Amateur golfers
Texas Tech Red Raiders men's golfers
Sportspeople from Santiago
1992 births
Living people
21st-century Chilean people